Brian Fitzgerald (born 22 March 1947) is an Irish politician. He was a Labour Party Teachta Dála (TD) for the Meath constituency from 1992 to 1997, and since 1999 has been an independent local councillor on Meath County Council.

Career
Previously a SIPTU trade union official, Fitzgerald was elected to Dáil Éireann for Meath during the swing to Labour at the 1992 general election. He had contested the seat unsuccessfully at the 1987 and 1989 general elections.

Like many other Labour TDs elected in 1992, he lost his seat at the 1997 general election. His seat was taken by John V. Farrelly of Fine Gael whom he had defeated in 1992.

Fitzgerald was an opponent of the Labour Party's decision to merge with Democratic Left and resigned from the party in 1999. He was re-elected to Meath County Council, as an independent councillor for the Dunshaughlin local electoral area at the 1999 local elections. At the 2002 and 2007 general elections, he stood as an independent candidate for Meath and Meath East constituencies, but again failed to win a seat on both occasions.

Fitzgerald was re-elected at the 2019 local elections as an independent candidate for Ratoath electoral area.

References

1947 births
Living people
Labour Party (Ireland) TDs
Irish trade unionists
Members of the 27th Dáil
Local councillors in County Meath
Independent politicians in Ireland